Miami State High School is a school in Miami, Queensland established as South Coast District State High School in 1963.

History
Originally named South Coast District State High School, Miami High was officially opened in April 1963. It soon became known as Miami High and, after a number of years, the more compact name was officially adopted. It was built to meet the needs of the rapidly expanding population on the Gold Coast.

The chosen site presented a number of construction challenges because the southern half was a swamp and the northern half was on the steep slope of Nobby's Headland, an upthrust of schist about 50 m high at its highest point.  The challenges were met by the simple expedient of blasting the slope and dumping the rubble in the swamp, but with a consequent complete loss of topsoil that created enduring problems for many years.

Construction always stayed behind the needs of the students throughout the sixties.  This was for three reasons: (a) it was an entirely new school competing with established schools for resources in a state that had allowed chronic neglect of its education infrastructure and which was in far worse condition than the larger states of Victoria (Australia) and New South Wales, (b) Miami High's construction coincided precisely with the transition of the Baby Boom Generation from primary school to high school, and (c) in 1964, Queensland's primary schools ceased to teach the eighth year, which was transferred to the high schools, so that the entry year to high school became year 8.

Consequently, in 1964, the infant Miami High went from catering to year 9 to catering to years 8, 9 and 10 with the state barely able to provide enough classrooms for the start of the year.  1965 and 1966 saw open underschool areas, originally intended for protection from sun and rain, being converted to temporary classrooms and several flimsy demountable buildings being installed as other temporary classrooms. Despite their nominally temporary nature, many of these structures were still in use twenty years later.  In 1967, the Australian federal government built a two-story, four-laboratory science block, as part of a program to improve the teaching of science throughout Australia.  Several of the laboratories were promptly pressed into service as regular classrooms.

The school has a pool, film and TV studio and a 1500 seat assembly hall.

The first principal was Claude Rayner. John Rowe was given the position in 1967. Bill Callinan took over as principal in 1969.

The first deputy principal was Ken Maynard, appointed in 1967.

The school's sign on the side of the hill is listed on the Gold Coast Local Heritage Register.

Current status
The school has approximately 1450 students with over 170 teaching staff. Miami High has introduced an international exchange program with students from all over the world now attending the school.

Expenditure on teacher participation in professional development for the year 2006 reached a total of $24,530. Permanent and temporary staff at the school had an attendance rate of 96% for the same year. The retention rate of staff from 2005 to 2006 was 95%. Student retention rates from year 8 to year 12 was 75%.

Notable alumni

Entertainment & Politics
Anna Bligh, former Premier of Queensland.
Richard Black, former Chief Technology Officer, Bank of England
Amanda Ware, Australia's Next Top Model, Cycle 6 Winner
Kim Watkins, TV Presenter

Sports

See also

List of schools in Queensland

References

Public high schools in Queensland
Schools on the Gold Coast, Queensland
Educational institutions established in 1963
1963 establishments in Australia